Lee Yoo-mi (born August 15, 1967), better known by her stage name Lee Young-ja is a South Korean comedian and television presenter. She is signed with iOK Company as her agency.

Career
Lee made her debut in the South Korean entertainment industry in 1991, after successfully winning MBC's comedy competition.

Personal life
In 2010, Lee became an ambassador for the World Disaster Relief Organization after going to Haiti on her talk show, Live Talk Show Taxi, and volunteering during the 2010 Haiti earthquake.

Filmography

Variety shows

Web series

Television series

Films

Awards and nominations

Listicles

References

External links

1968 births
Living people
South Korean women comedians
South Korean television presenters
South Korean women television presenters
South Korean radio presenters
Seoul Institute of the Arts alumni
South Korean women radio presenters
Best Variety Performer Female Paeksang Arts Award (television) winners